A Viagem (The Voyage) is a Brazilian TV soap opera produced by TV Globo. It was written by Ivani Ribeiro with the contribution of Solange Castro Neves, and directed by Wolf Maya, Ignácio Coqueiro and Andre Schultz. The soap first aired from April 11, 1994, until October 22 of the same year and includes 167 episodes.

The twisted plot deals with the sorrows and hopes of ordinary people and their love or enmity with each other. Supernatural powers affect them until in the end peace and goodwill are restored.

Synopsis
Alexandre Toledo carries out an assault, during which he kills a man who surprises him. He manages to flee the spot, but his brother Raul and his brother-in-law Teodoro (Téo) turn him in to the police. On the other hand, Alexandre's sister and Téo's wife Diná tries to defend her brother. She seeks assistance with lawyer Otávio Jordão (and ultimately falls in love with him), but he refuses to help her because the victim was a good friend of his. Subsequently, Alexandre is condemned to a life sentence in prison. He commits suicide, prior to which he vows to retaliate those who helped to bring him thus far "in this life or another". As a ghost, he starts tormenting the others, especially Raul, whose marriage to Andreza he ruins. Alexandre's spirit is also responsible for Otávio dying in a car crash.

In another subplot, Téo decides to leave Diná, because she holds him responsible for Alexandre's death. Téo becomes affected with Alexandre's former girlfriend Lisandra (Lisa) instead and marries her in the end.

Following Alexandre's suicide, Alberto Rezende, the doctor and friend of the family, offers his help to Alexandre's mother, Mrs. Maroca as well as all other the family members. In the beginning, Alberto is attracted by Diná, but later his affection turns towards Estela, Diná's elder sister. In the end, they get married. Alberto is the only person realizing that Alexandre's spirit is responsible for the mishaps. As a medium (adept of Allan Kardec's Spiritism doctrine), he tries to get Alexandre's doomed soul back on the path to heaven.

Estela, on her part, has troubles with her teenage daughter Beatriz (Bia). Beatrix's father, Ismael Novaes, left the family. He is a drug dealer and promoter of illegal gambling (by which be has become wealthy). After years of absence he reappears, exerting a bad influence on his daughter. Beatriz decides to leave her mother to live with her father instead. Bia starts a relationship with Otávio (Tato), Otávio's son. Now also contacting Ismael, Tato becomes addicted to drugs and loses all his money by gambling. This leads Beatriz to run away from him and dating Taco's former brother-in-law instead. Noticing it, Taco leads a business campaign nearly ruining his rival.

Diná desperately tries to find Beatriz and bring her back to her mother. When she finally succeeds, she suddenly dies from a heart attack. In heaven, her spirit teams up with Otavio's to save Alexandre's soul. In the end of the soap opera, they manage to do so and bring peace to all characters. Thus, Raul and Andreza get along again.

Cast

References

External links 
 

Brazilian telenovelas
TV Globo telenovelas
1994 telenovelas
1994 Brazilian television series debuts
1994 Brazilian television series endings
Portuguese-language telenovelas
Telenovelas about spiritism